Yanacachi Municipality is the third municipal section of the Sud Yungas Province in the  La Paz Department, Bolivia. Its seat is Yanacachi.

Geography 
The Cordillera Real traverses the municipality. Some of the highest mountains of the municipality are listed below:

See also 
 Jach'a Quta

References 

  Instituto Nacional de Estadistica de Bolivia  (INE)

Municipalities of La Paz Department (Bolivia)